King James Version is the second studio album by American rock band Harvey Danger, released on September 12, 2000 through London-Sire Records. It was the band's major label debut, and was their last album to feature drummer Evan Sult. The album was written and recorded over the span of sixteen months, with writing for the album beginning in November 1998. The album was first recorded between March and April 1999 with producer John Goodmanson at Bearsville Sound Studio in Woodstock, New York, with additional recording taking place at Bear Creek Studio in Woodinville, Washington and at John & Stu's Place in Seattle, Washington. Owing to a contractual dispute between the band's record label London Recordings USA (which had been sold to Warner Music Group) and its former parent company Universal Music Group (UMG) over the rights to the band's catalogue, King James Version was indefinitely delayed, which gave the band more time to work on the album and develop its sound. Recording sessions for the album wrapped up in February 2000, and following this the band signed with London-Sire, who approved of its release in July of that year. 

Primarily a indie rock, alternative rock and pop rock album, King James Version encompasses a variety of rock music styles, and its more expansive and adventurous direction stemmed from the band's desire to rid themselves of their reputation as a one-hit wonder, following the massive success of the band's debut single "Flagpole Sitta". The album's lyrics discuss "the conflict between faith and skepticism", and feature numerous allusions and references to popular culture, historical figures, places and works of literature. 

Preceded by the release of the minor hit single "Sad Sweetheart of the Rodeo", King James Version received favourable reviews from critics, who praised its ambitious musical direction and considered it to be an improvement over the band's debut album Where Have All the Merrymakers Gone? (1997). However, owing to a lack of promotional support, sales of the album were extremely poor; by 2005, only 25,000 copies of the album had been sold in the United States. The failure of King James Version led to the band disbanding the following year, before reforming in 2004. The album has since attracted a cult following and achieved critical acclaim, and several publications have named it one of the best albums of the 2000s.

Background 
Harvey Danger formed in 1992, and recorded a demo tape in 1996 to send to major labels. While the demo failed to garner any interest from major labels, it attracted the attention of Greg Glover, an intern at the US division of London Recordings, who released their debut studio album, Where Have All the Merrymakers Gone?, through his record label, the Arena Rock Recording Company, in July 1997. While not a strong success upon its initial release, the album's second track, "Flagpole Sitta", began receiving airplay from several college radio stations, and soon after Harvey Danger became the subject of a major label bidding war, with the band ultimately deciding to sign to London's Slash Records imprint in March 1998, where Glover had just been hired. Upon the wider re-release of Where Have All the Merrymakers Gone? and "Flagpole Sitta" as a single in April 1998, "Flagpole Sitta" became a hit, propelling Harvey Danger into the mainstream and pushing Where Have All the Merrymakers Gone? to number 70 on the Billboard 200. The album went on to sell over 500,000 copies in the United States, and in February 1999 was certified Gold by the Recording Industry Association of America (RIAA). Despite the single's success, "Flagpole Sitta" also brought a lot of negative attention towards the band, who began to be dismissed by critics, publications and listeners as a one-hit wonder and a "major label fabrication", something which frontman Sean Nelson attributed to listeners taking the song's ironic lyrics and messages at "face value".

Harvey Danger and MTV host Matt Pinfield wanted "Carlotta Valdez" to be the album's second single, but Slash/London objected to this and issued "Private Helicopter" as the second single in October 1998 instead. The single performed poorly, not reaching any Billboard charts, and soon after Harvey Danger ceased touring and returned home in November 1998. After returning home, the members of Harvey Danger took a brief break from music for the holidays. While the band initially considered breaking up during this small hiatus, they decided against it and began writing new material for their next album in November 1998. The band, who were determined to distance themselves from the overshadowing success of "Flagpole Sitta", deliberately wrote songs that were more experimental and less commercial-sounding than their previous works. "Our stated position was that we were never going to write another song like 'Flagpole Sitta.'", explained Nelson; "We would write long seven-minute slow songs without a chorus just to prove we were more than this hit single. It tweaks your entire consciousness to be identified by only one song when you are so dead set on being recognized for all the other things you have to offer." Harvey Danger also considered their upcoming major label debut to be their first "real" album, as Where Have All the Merrymakers Gone? was "bascially [sic] a bunch of demos recorded on the cheap".

Writing and recording 
After completing work on the album's demos in February 1999, Harvey Danger travelled to Woodstock, New York in early March 1999 to record the basic tracks and some of the overdubs for King James Version at Bearsville Sound with Where Have All the Merrymakers Gone? producer John Goodmanson. The band found working at Bearsville Sound to be "depressing", and ultimately decided to return to Seattle to record the rest of the album. "[I]t felt like we were spending a lot of money just so we could say we recorded at Bearsville. It wasn't necessarily making us play better. So we went back home to do the rest." After returning to Washington, the band recorded additional overdubs for the album at John & Stu's Place in Seattle and at Bear Creek Studio in Woodinville, to help give the album "more breadth, [and] some more colors". At each of the studios the band worked at, King James Version was recorded onto 2-inch analogue tape using two 24-track tape machines synched together, allowing the band to use 48 tracks in total. Recording was completed in late April 1999, and following this the band travelled to Los Angeles, California to mix the album at The Village Recorder on May 17, 1999.

Harvey Danger initially hoped that King James Version would be released in August/September 1999, but owing to a series of corporate mergers and restructurings, the album was indefinitely shelved. Universal Music Group (UMG), whom had recently merged with London's parent company PolyGram in December 1998, had sold London Recordings' US division to Warner Music Group, and in August 1999 Warner Music Group announced that it would be merging London with its Sire Records Group to create London-Sire Records. Shortly thereafter, a contractual dispute arose between London and UMG, resulting in London losing the rights over the band's contract. As a result, Harvey Danger were left in a "corporate black hole" and unsure if King James Version would ever be released. Nelson later said that he felt "morose" and "suicidally depressed" during 1999 as a result of the delays. Additionally, Goodmanson, who allowed Harvey Danger to record at John & Stu's on the belief that he would be quickly reimbursed, took a financial hit, although he was later compensated fully by the band.

In between the band's corporate struggles, the members of Harvey Danger put the album on hold and went to work on their own individual projects. When the band came back and revisited the album with a different perspective, they decided to re-work, and write new songs for, King James Version. Nelson described this period as the album's "second gestation period", and Harvey Danger continued to revise the album until they were satisfied, with the band finishing recording in late February 2000. During this period, Harvey Danger recorded three new songs for inclusion on the album in In October 1999, "Meetings With Remarkable Men" (originally titled "Ain't Got No Dog in That Race"), "Humility on Parade" and "Loyalty Bldg.". In June 2000, the band re-mixed/mixed the majority of the album's tracks (excluding "Why I'm Lonely", "You Miss the Point Completely I Get the Point Exactly", "(Theme from) Carjack Fever" and "The Same as Being in Love") at The Warehouse Studio in Vancouver, B.C. Nelson later remarked that Harvey Danger had "finished" King James Version three times during the course of 1999 and 2000.

Composition

Music 
Musically, King James Version has been described as indie rock, alternative rock and pop rock. Reviews also described the album as featuring influences of power pop, rockabilly, glam rock and punk rock throughout the album's tracks. In contrast to the band's debut album, King James Version features a less grungy and lo-fi sound, and uses a wider variety of instruments, including the extensive use of keyboards, piano, pump organ. Jeff J. Lin, who is classically trained, also composed string arrangements throughout the album, with cello and viola being played by members of the Seattle Symphony. "Sad Sweetheart of the Rodeo" was described by Billboard as featuring a "laid-back feel complete with 80's retro guitar effects." "(Theme from) Carjack Fever" is a reworked version of "Carjack Fever", an early Harvey Danger song first recorded in 1995 which later appeared in an unfinished state/played in reverse as a hidden track on Where Have All the Merrymakers Gone?. "Pike St./Park Slope" is a sombre piano ballad which was compared to the works of Ben Folds and John Lennon's "Imagine". "Underground" is a "radically rearranged" cover of a song by the Seattle band This Busy Monster. Nelson's vocal performances were compared to Chuck Berry, Robert Smith and Richard Hell.

The musical direction of King James Version changed several times throughout its conception, with the album initially planned on being a "dour, mellow anti-pop" record. However, after hearing about the success the English rock band Radiohead had found with their 1997 album OK Computer, which Nelson described as the "ultimate one-hit wonder redemption narrative", the band scrapped this idea and felt as though they had to make a "great leap forward, artistically, and do something really ambitious" if they were to maintain their credibility. However, as Harvey Danger were just a "garage band" and not able to figure out how to reach Radiohead's creative and technical heights, the band began to strip back their arrangements. Regardless, Nelson still credited OK Computer as an influence on the album's overall atmosphere. "It certainly was no OK Computer, though there are a couple of moments where we obviously are reaching for that kind of faux-epic sound. I’ve listened to King James Version a lot and I don’t know what the hell it sounds like." Speaking with Yahoo! Launch, Nelson labelled the album a middle ground between "catchy rock" and "very quiet, pretty songs".

Lyrics 
The lyrics on King James Version, written solely by Nelson, are heavily philosophical and ambiguous, and primarily discuss "the conflict between faith and skepticism". The album's lyrics are often humorous, cynical, sarcastic or deadpan in nature and feature numerous references to historical popular culture, literature and places, and frequently name-drop various popular figures and musicians, such as Jesus, F. Scott Fitzgerald, Nathanael West, the Malboro Man and Morrissey. Nelson also incorporated the use of multiple literary devices into the album's songs, especially with the use of first person, multiple and unreliable narrators, as well as using the album's lyrics as dialogues. Nelson described the album as being "very personal, but not autobiographical", and "more in the way of character study than autobiographical revelation." The album's opening track, "Meetings with Remarkable Men (Show Me the Hero)", is about a guy "looking for somebody to be a disciple of. Jesus doesn't work, Morrissey doesn't work, and Kip Winger is the only one who provides a voice of reason." "Sad Sweetheart of the Rodeo" directly alludes to Sweetheart of the Rodeo by The Byrds, and also references "Lonesome Cowboy Bill" by The Velvet Underground.

The heavily referential nature of King James Version's lyrics was inspired by the works of Frederic Tuten, an American novelist known for his style of referencing to the past vis-a-vis to the present in his works. "I feel that's a huge part of listening to rock n' roll music. As a listener, when I want to talk about anything with my friends, I can casually say half a line from any of a hundred songs and they know exactly what I'm talking about. I don't have to elucidate [(explain)] the sentiment any further. It's admitting rock songs can be a response to rock songs, and not necessarily be just so referential that they're just about rock songs." Nelson thanks Tuten in the album's liner notes, and also thanks novelist Philip Roth and Le Show by Harry Shearer. To further connect with the album's recurring theme of referencing other musicians and people, King James Version features an array of backup vocalists, including Grant Lee Buffallo's Grant-Lee Phillips and Death Cab for Cutie's Ben Gibbard, in order to "reflect many, many voices." Nelson deliberately avoided writing about the band's struggles with their success, believing the subject to be "stupid and irrelevant to most people that listen to music."

Title and packaging 
The album's title of King James Version is both a reference to the King James Version of the Bible, and to the album's "second gestation period". Nelson described the album's title as referring to "coming through a convoluted process and arriving at a version of the album and the band that feels sort of definitive." The album title attracted some controversy from Christians, who felt it was blasphemous.

The album's artwork was done by Tae Won Yu; Nelson described the artwork as an expression of "[the] band's fractured mental and psychic state, or relationship to ourselves, our city, our project, and each other." He also described the artwork as "beautiful/terrible/perfect" and "a mess", which he attributed to the band micromanaging Tae Won Yu "into  the ground", and said that it was printed with the wrong shade of blue.

Release and promotion 
Following the album's completion, Harvey Danger shopped King James Version around to several other labels on the UMG grapevine, but were systematically reviewed and rejected by all of them. Afterwards, Harvey Danger chose to re-sign with their "new/old" label, London-Sire Records, in June 2000. On July 6, 2000, Harvey Danger announced on their website that King James Version had now been fully sequenced, mastered and approved by London-Sire, and unveiled the new album's title and release date. Prior to the album's release, Harvey Danger expanded into a sextet with the introduction of guitarist Mike Squires and keyboard player John Roderick, in an effort to improve the quality of band's live shows.

King James Version was released in the United States and Canada on September 12, 2000. Alongside the album, a self-titled EP, containing three B-sides from the King James Version sessions, was sold with purchases of the album exclusively at Circuit City stores, limited to 3,000 copies. The EP's songs were later included in the band's 2009 compilation album Dead Sea Scrolls. Nelson attempted to get King James Version (including its B-sides) released on vinyl through Barsuk Records, who he was a partner of, but these plans fell through due to legal issues surrounding licensing.

London-Sire promoted King James Version with the release of one single, "Sad Sweetheart of the Rodeo", which was serviced to radio on August 7, 2000. The single became a minor hit for the band, reaching number 27 on the Alternative Airplay chart and remaining on the chart for nine weeks.  The band filmed a music video for the song, directed by Evan Bernard, in Los Angeles, California on August 15 and 16, 2000. The music video was due to premiere on MTV's 120 Minutes on September 24, 2000, but an MTV intern played the music video for "Flagpole Sitta" by accident instead. MTV responded to the band's complaints by claiming that the video for "Sad Sweetheart of the Rodeo" had received poor test screenings, and pulled it from rotation after only two airings. The band also made a televised appearance on The Late Late Show with Craig Kilborn performing the song on October 18, 2000, with John Roderick filling in for Aaron Huffman on bass due to Huffman becoming ill. The album's second single, "Authenticity", was released on August 28, 2001 through Gold Circle Records. The song had been proposed as a single by the band for nearly a year, owing to its inclusions in the soundtracks of Dude, Where's My Car? (2000) and Soul Survivors (2001); Gold Circle were distributing the Soul Survivors soundtrack on September 24, 2001, and featured "Authenticity" in the film and its trailers. However, the single did not receive a music video or any widespread promotion, as Harvey Danger had broken up by the time it was released.

Harvey Danger initially embarked on a national tour across the United States throughout the first half of September 2000 in support of King James Version, including a performance in Montreal, Quebec and an acoustic set at Tower Records in Seattle on September 12. From October 7 to October 27, 2000, Harvey Danger toured as an opening act for the pop-punk band SR-71, alongside the power pop band Wheatus, who acted as the band's opening act on some of the SR-71 tour dates. Following the end of the band's tour with SR-71, London-Sire pulled the band's touring support, leaving Harvey Danger unable to tour nationally and financially constrained to the Pacific Northwest of the US. The lack of touring support meant that Harvey Danger was forced to turn down an offer to tour as an opening act for The Pretenders.

The remainder of the band's shows in 2000 took place in the band's hometown of Seattle during late December, where the band performed three songs for the Screaming Santa's X-Mas Show at the I-Spy on December 23, and a New Years' Eve show at Consolidated Works. From March 22 to 24, 2001, Harvey Danger performed as an opener for Alien Crime Syndicate. The band played their final show of that year on April 21, 2001, playing alongside Hazel and Quasi.

Reception

Critical 
King James Version received generally favourable reviews from critics at the time of its release, and was generally considered to be an improvement over Where Have All the Merrymakers Gone?. 

Par Winberg of Melodic felt that the album was a grower, and that the band's sound, which he described as "Rolling Stones with a modern rock costume", was unique. James Sullivan of Entertainment Weekly described the album as "mold-busting" and "a play for longevity". Bob Remstein of Wall of Sound praised the album's catchiness and clever humour, dubbing the album "smart-rock". David Wild of Rolling Stone magazine called King James Version "barbed", but praised the album as "a step forward in both ambition and accomplishment", describing the album as "exceptionally tuneful postmodern pop in the wry tradition of XTC and the Posies". Writing about the album in passing, Eric Weisbard of SPIN described King James Version as "[kicking] their debut album's ass", and praised the Nelson's greater confidence as a frontman and the band's improved cohesiveness.

Critical assessments on the lyrical content of King James Version were more mixed. Remstein felt that Nelson's lyrics were overdone at points, and Sullivan took issue with the "caustic" nature of the lyrics; Weisbard also questioned whether the album's "witty swagger and rejection of novelty grade goofiness" would be misunderstood by listeners. However, both Remstein and Sullivan agreed that the album's smart humour prevailed over both of the highlighted issues of the lyrics. Similarly, Alex Pappademas of CMJ New Music Monthly praised Nelson for his improved songwriting, and for "[figuring] out how to make assets out of the traits that used to make him annoying".

Commercial 
Despite being well received, King James Version failed to chart on the US Billboard 200 chart. Public awareness of the album's release was low, with Johnny Loftus of Glorious Noise remarking in 2001 that "King James Version [had been] released to the kind of fanfare reserved for a CCM crossover act". By 2005, King James Version had reportedly sold 25,000 copies in the United States, a number which paled in comparison to the sales of Where Have All the Merrymakers Gone?, which had sold over 500,000 copies by the same date.

Legacy 

The members of Harvey Danger were greatly upset by the failure of King James Version, which they attributed to London-Sire's ineffectual marketing and distribution of the album, and felt as though the album had not truly been "released". "Technically it was released, but it was released so poorly and haphazardly promoted that we just felt we had been robbed of an experience that was important to us."

As a result of the album's failure, which Nelson described as "life altering", the members of Harvey Danger decided to split up. "We inevitably started hating each other, because who else was there to hate? We broke up because we had nothing else to say to each other at that point." The band's hiatus, which started after the band played their last show in April 2001, lasted until April 2004. During the hiatus, the members of the band pursued a number of musical and non-musical endeavours, with Nelson becoming a movie critic for the Seattle bi-weekly newspaper The Stranger and a business partner at Barsuk Records, and later formed a new band with Roderick, The Long Winters, in 2002. He later left The Long Winters so he could start work on a solo album, which led to him reconnecting with guitarist Jeff Lin and bassist Aaron Huffman, prompting the band to reform. Drummer Evan Sult, who had moved to Chicago, Illinois during the hiatus and joined the indie rock band Bound Stems, declined to join the band's reunion, and was subsequently replaced by Michael Welke for the rest of the band's existence until their breakup in 2009. The negative experiences regarding the release and promotion of King James Version influenced the band's choice to release their follow up album, Little by Little... (2005), for free on the band's website, a decision which Nelson said gave the band "that sense of satisfaction or closure that comes from making a record and releasing it to the public. They either embrace it or don't, but at least they'll have the option of noticing it this time."

In the absence of commercial success, King James Version slowly attained a cult following through word of mouth, and its critical standing continued to rise years after its release. The album is now considered to be the band's best work, and several publications have called the album one of the most underrated, and greatest, albums of the 2000s. Writing about the album in 2013, Evan Sawdey of PopMatters wrote;"Even though Little By Little garnered considerable acclaim and made the band become known for more than just “Flagpole Sitta”, it’s amazing how many people have glossed over King James Version altogether. When you sit down and think about it, though, it’s not really that surprising: wedged between their “commercial peak” and “artistic rebirth,” this little album got lost due to unfortunate circumstance more than anything else. Yet, as the years have gone on, it’s gradually found one hell of an audience. People have picked up it casually — via recommendations from friends, impulse budget-bin purchases, or otherwise — and, slowly and surely over the years, the album got discovered as what it is: one of the greatest rock albums of the decade."Alex Young of Consequence of Sound lauded King James Version as the "most underappreciated album of 2000", writing, "...everyone should give King James Version a fighting chance because it is by far their best recording. It’s digest-able, approachable, funny, catchy and if not for certain powers that be or better timing they may have been placed higher in most collections alongside other Seattle superstars." NPR Music also praised the album in 2011, describing it as "ambitious and frequently beautiful" and having "aged exceptionally well" in the years following its release. Myles Griffin of the Spartanburg Herald-Journal labelled the album as "one of the most creative and enjoyable rock albums of the decade" in 2008.

Sean Nelson later recognised King James Version's status as a "cult gem" several years following its release, which allowed him to move on from the negative experiences surround its promotion and release. "I'd met lots of people over the years who told me they knew of [King James Version], had bought it for a penny on eBay, had found it one evening out someone's coffee table, had discovered an entire landfill made out of it, and it always made me grateful. But really going out into the world and seeing the way people had internalized the songs, knew every word, leaped for joy when the opening chords rang out—it simply alleviated several years' worth of compounded anxiety and allowed me to move on." Harvey Danger performed King James Version in its entirety on March 7, 2008,  at The Triple Door in Seattle, Washington as part of a set of concerts commemorating the 10th anniversary of Where Have All The Merrymakers Gone?. Ten out of the album's twelve songs (excluding "You Miss the Point Completely I Get the Point Exactly" and "(This Is) The Thrilling Conversation You've Been Waiting For") were played at the band's final show at The Crocodile Café in Seattle on August 29, 2009.

Accolades

Track listing

Personnel
Credits are adapted from the album's liner notes.

Harvey Danger

 Sean Nelson – Lead and backing vocals, keyboards, melodian, tambourine, triangle
 Jeff J. Lin – guitar, piano, Hammond organ, theremin, xylophone, "silver box o' death", string arrangements
 Aaron Huffman – bass guitar, guitar, pipe organ, vibraphone
 Evan Sult – drums

Additional musicians
 Anne Marie Ruljancich – backing vocals 
 Grant-Lee Phillips – backing vocals 
 Ben Gibbard – backing vocals 
 Ken Stringfellow – backing vocals 
 Lois Maffeo – backing vocals 
 Marc Olsen – slide guitar 
 Jami Sieber – electric cello 
 Terri Benshoof – cello 
 Christopher Possanza – songwriting 
 Larry Sult – banjo 
 Rajan Krishnaswami – cello 
 Joe Gottesman – viola 
 Shari Link – viola Production

 John Goodmanson – production, engineering, mixing
 Damien Shannon – assistant engineer (at Bearsville)
 Aaron Franz – assistant engineer (at Bearsville)
 Carl Plaster – drum tech (at Bearsville)
 Fisher – guitar tech (at Bearsville)
 Ryan Hadlock – assistant engineer (at Bear Creek)
 Zack Blackstone – assistant engineer (at John & Stu's)
 Okhee Kim – assistant engineer (at The Village Recorder)
 Greg Calbi – masteringManagement
 AAM – management
 Peter Lewit – legal representation (from Davis, Shapiro and Lewit, LLC)
 Greg Glover –  A&R
 Little Big Man – booking agent
Artwork
 Tae Won Yu – art direction, design, photography

Release history

Notes

References

Citations

Sources

External links
Harvey Danger's official site
The Annotated King James Version (Harvey Danger), featuring the album's lyrics and allusions.

2000 albums
Harvey Danger albums
Albums produced by John Goodmanson
Indie rock albums
Indie rock albums by American artists
Alternative rock albums
Alternative rock albums by American artists
Albums recorded at Bear Creek Studio